Kim Herkle (born 5 January 2003) is a German swimmer. She competed in the women's 200 metre breaststroke event at the 2020 European Aquatics Championships, in Budapest, Hungary.

Herkle joined the University of Louisville Cardinals swim team in 2021. She is majoring in psychology.

References

2003 births
Living people
German female swimmers
German female breaststroke swimmers
Place of birth missing (living people)
21st-century German women
Louisville Cardinals women's swimmers
German expatriate sportspeople in the United States
Sportspeople from Stuttgart